Designblok is a design festival held in Prague, Czech Republic annually in October since 1999.

History
The festival was inspired by Milan Design Week. The first edition of the festival in 1999 had fourteen participants, and was aimed at people working in the design industry. It has grown to about 200 participants and 30,000 visitors.

Venues
The festival is held at a main venue, Superstudio, which is a different place for each edition, together with a number of other venues in Prague.

References

External links
 Designblok official site

Festivals in Prague
Recurring events established in 1999
1999 establishments in the Czech Republic
Autumn events in the Czech Republic